The Vorona is a river in the Penza, Tambov, and Voronezh oblasts in Russia. The river is frozen over from the beginning of December to the first half of April. Its main tributary is the Chembar.

The towns of Kirsanov, Uvarovo, and Borisoglebsk are along the Vorona.

References

Rivers of Penza Oblast
Rivers of Tambov Oblast
Rivers of Voronezh Oblast